The dotCAT foundation is a Catalan private non-profit foundation established on 28 December 2004 and registered under number 2100 in the Foundations Register of the Generalitat of Catalonia.

The mission of the Foundation is to promote all kinds of activities related to the creation, management and control of the domain name .cat and, in general, to promote the Catalan language and culture in the field of Internet and the Information and Communication Technologies.

The offices of Fundació puntCAT were raided by Spanish police on September 20, 2017, as a result of the 2017 Spanish constitutional crisis.

References

External links
 Official website

Mass media in Catalonia
Organizations established in 2004
Internet in Spain
Internet in Europe